Michael Turner (born February 13, 1982) is an American former football running back who played in the National Football League (NFL). He was drafted by the San Diego Chargers in the fifth round of the 2004 NFL Draft and also played for the Atlanta Falcons. He played college football at Northern Illinois.

Early years
Turner attended North Chicago Community High School in North Chicago, Illinois. In 1999, he led his team to a 6–4 mark and the first playoff bid in 8 years by rushing for 1,392 yards and 14 touchdowns (10.5 average). His biggest game was for 295 yards on 19 carries including touchdown runs of 67 and school-record 90 yards in a win over Zion-Benton. He was named the Offensive Player of the Year and was a unanimous first-team All-North Suburban Conference player. He finished his high school career with 2,732 rushing yards and 26 total touchdowns. Turner also lettered in track & field at North Chicago, where he was a sectional 100-meter dash champion with a time of 11.15 seconds.

College career
He attended Northern Illinois University, and played for the Northern Illinois Huskies football team. As a junior, he finished second in the nation with 1,915 yards, including five 200+ yd games and two games with five touchdowns. In 2003, he finished second in the NCAA in rushing, behind his future NFL teammate Darren Sproles,  with 1,648 yards. He left NIU with the school records for rushing yards (4,941), touchdowns (43) and all-purpose yards (5,392). Since his departure from NIU, two records (rushing yards and touchdowns) have been broken by Garrett Wolfe.

Professional career

Pre-draft

San Diego Chargers
Turner was drafted by the Chargers in the fifth round (154th overall) of the 2004 NFL Draft. As a rookie, Turner played mostly on special teams, but started and ran for 87 yards in the regular-season finale against the Kansas City Chiefs.

Turner had again spent most of 2005 on the bench as backup to Pro Bowl starter LaDainian Tomlinson. But in the December 18 game against the undefeated Indianapolis Colts, Turner came off the bench to run for 113 yards, including a game-clinching 83-yard touchdown.

During the 2007 off season, Chargers' General Manager A.J. Smith stated that the Chargers would be willing to trade Turner in exchange for both a first and third round draft pick. However, a day after 2007 NFL Draft concluded, A.J. Smith stated that Michael Turner would remain a Charger for the 2007 season. He would no longer be accepting trade offers from other NFL teams for Turner.

On April 26, 2007, Turner signed the $2.35 million, one-year tender he received from the Chargers after becoming a restricted free agent.

On January 13, 2008, Turner gained attention when he filled in ably for the Chargers' injured starter Tomlinson early in an AFC Divisional playoff game against the Indianapolis Colts, gaining 71 yards on 17 carries, including several key runs.

Atlanta Falcons

On March 2, 2008, the Atlanta Falcons signed Turner to a six-year, $34.5 million contract with $15 million guaranteed. He was represented by agent James "Bus" Cook.

In his Falcon debut, Turner broke the Falcons' single game rushing record against the Detroit Lions on September 7, 2008, rushing for 220 yards on 22 carries with 2 touchdowns. His 220 yards against the Lions marked the third-highest opening day rushing total behind O. J. Simpson’s 250 yards in 1973 and Arian Foster's 231 yards in 2010  and his rushing total is also the most in NFL annals by a player in his first game with a new team and surpassed the previous mark of 202 yards  setting  by running back Gerald Riggs on September 2, 1984. Coincidentally, Turner became the first Falcons offensive player of the week following an NFL season opening weekend since Riggs earned the honor after setting his record in 1984. He was named NFC Offensive Player of the week for this performance. On November 23, 2008, he set a personal record with 4 rushing TDs in a victory over the Carolina Panthers.  He compiled 117 yards rushing during that same game. His seventeen rushing touchdowns during the 2008 season broke the Atlanta Falcons' single season record of 14 set by Jamal Anderson in 1998, it is also the second-most in NFL history for a first season with a team behind only Eric Dickerson (18). He finished the year with 1,699 yards (a 4.5 ypc avg) and 17 rushing touchdowns. He is the first Atlanta Falcon in history to start and finish a season with 200 yard rushing performances (220 against Detroit week 1 and 208 against St. Louis week 17).

On December 16, 2008, Turner was named to the 2009 Pro Bowl, along with fellow Falcon WR Roddy White.

Turner and teammates Roddy White, Eric Weems, Ovie Mughelli, Brent Grimes, Tony Gonzalez, John Abraham, Tyson Clabo, and Matt Ryan were voted to the 2011 Pro Bowl.

On January 1, 2012, Turner broke Gerald Riggs's franchise rushing touchdown record against the Tampa Bay Buccaneers. Turner rushed for 2 touchdowns, bringing his total rushing touchdowns as a Falcon to 60.

On March 1, 2013, Turner was released by the Falcons after failing a physical, saving the team $6.9 million in salary-cap space.

After his release from the Falcons, Turner did not sign with another NFL team.

Falcons franchise records
 Most career rushing touchdowns (66)
 Most rushing touchdowns in a season: 17 (2008)

NFL career statistics

References

External links
Atlanta Falcons bio

1982 births
Living people
American football return specialists
American football running backs
Atlanta Falcons players
National Conference Pro Bowl players
Northern Illinois Huskies football players
Players of American football from Illinois
San Diego Chargers players
Sportspeople from Waukegan, Illinois